"Do the Math" is a song recorded by Canadian country music artist George Fox. It was released in 1998 as the second single from his sixth studio album, Survivor. It peaked at number 17 on the RPM Country Tracks chart in September 1998.

Chart performance

Year-end charts

References

1998 songs
1998 singles
George Fox songs
Warner Music Group singles
Songs written by George Fox (singer)
Songs written by Kim Tribble